Rajendra Prasad Shrestha is a Senior Nepalese politician, belonging to the People's Socialist Party, Nepal (PSPN), and is currently serving as the Minister of The Federal Affairs and General Administration. He was elected in First Federal Parliament as a member of House of Representatives from Proportional Representation in 2017.

He is the renowned scholar who propounded the concept of Federal Socialism in 2012 with its key motto- "Federalism for the emancipation of oppressed nationalities and socialism for the emancipation of working class." This new political ideology served as the bedrock for unification with various political forces that founded People's Socialist Party, Nepal. The guiding principle of the PSPN is currently known as Enhanced Federal Socialism.

References

Nepal MPs 2017–2022
Living people
Government ministers of Nepal
Nepal MPs 1994–1999
Communist Party of Nepal (Unified Marxist–Leninist) politicians
People's Socialist Party, Nepal politicians
1960 births